The Black Tor Ferry, also known as the Padstow to Rock Ferry, is a passenger ferry which crosses the tidal River Camel in north Cornwall, United Kingdom. The ferry carries pedestrians and cyclists only (not vehicles).

History
There has been a ferry at Black Rock Passage since 1337, the right originally belonging to the Duchy manor of Penmayne. Today the ferry operates on demand, daily in the summer and Monday to Saturday in the winter, the service being operated by Padstow Harbour Commissioners.

Route
The ferry connects the town of Padstow on the west bank of the river to the village of Rock on the east bank.

References

External links 

 Ferry page at Padstow Harbour Commissioners website

Ferry transport in England
Water transport in Cornwall